D48 is a state road connecting the city of Pazin with D21 and D302 state roads near Baderna, the latter serving as a connecting road to A9/B9 expressway.

The D48 road thus serves as a connection between the two arms of Istrian Y and towns in the centre of Istria peninsula, including Pazin, Baderna and Žminj.

The road, as well as all other state roads in Croatia, is managed and maintained by Hrvatske ceste, a state-owned company.

Traffic volume 

Traffic is regularly counted and reported by Hrvatske ceste, operator of the road. Substantial variations between annual (AADT) and summer (ASDT) traffic volumes are attributed to the fact that the road connects two arms of Istrian Y carrying substantial tourist traffic.

Road junctions and populated areas

Sources

External links
 Bina-Istra

D048
D048